Pohronský Inovec is a mountain range in Slovakia, part of the Slovenské stredohorie ranges of the Inner Western Carpathians.

The range is volcanic in origin, and composed of andesite and rhyolites. The southern portion is covered by deciduous forest, predominantly oak with more beeches at higher elevations.

The ruins of the medieval stone watchtower Živánská věž (Živánská Tower) stands within the range, near the village of Jedľové Kostolany in the Zlaté Moravce District.  It's also the headwaters of the Žitava River.

Mountain ranges of Slovakia
Mountain ranges of the Western Carpathians